Nikolaos Georgopoulos (born 31 January 1937 in Athens) is a Greek former sprinter who competed in the 1960 Summer Olympics.

He was part of Greece's winning 4×400 metres relay team at the 1959 Mediterranean Games. He also represented his country at the European Athletics Championships in 1954 and 1958, and was a 200 metres silver medallist at the 1959 Universiade.

References

External links
 

1937 births
Living people
Greek male sprinters
Athletes from Athens
Olympic athletes of Greece
Athletes (track and field) at the 1960 Summer Olympics
Universiade medalists in athletics (track and field)
Athletes (track and field) at the 1959 Mediterranean Games
Mediterranean Games gold medalists for Greece
Mediterranean Games medalists in athletics
Universiade silver medalists for Greece
Medalists at the 1959 Summer Universiade
20th-century Greek people